Epicnistis euryscia is a moth of the family Gracillariidae. It is known from Tasmania, Australia.

References

Gracillariinae